Tenglin is a family name, most probably originated from Sweden.

Certain genealogy studies concludes that the first person with the name Tenglin was Johan Larsson that later on at age 20, changed his family name to Tenglin. Johan was born 1769 in Skogs-Tibble outside Uppland / Sweden

More information about a survivor from Titanic, Mr Gunnar Isidor Tenglin:
http://www.encyclopedia-titanica.org/biography/1251/

Surnames